Cervin Robinson (May 18, 1928 – December 27, 2022) was an American photographer and author best known for architectural photography and historical writings that span his career, active from 1957 to his death.

Early life 
Robinson was born in Boston, Massachusetts, the younger child of Frank Robinson and Mary Burchill Robinson.

Robinson received an A.B. in English Literature from Harvard University in 1950 and soon after was drafted into the U. S. Army where he gained an abiding interest in map projections and perspective. Impressed early in his life with physics and photography, he continued to photograph in earnest while stationed with the Army in Germany. Upon return to the U.S., he became the assistant for Walker Evans (1953–1957), and traveled through much of the American heartland.

Robinson died on December 27, 2022, at the age of 94.

Career 

In 1958, Robinson began contract work for the Historic American Buildings Survey (HABS) photographing in the northeast sector from Maine to Pennsylvania and into the Middle West. At the same time, he acted as American representative for  the London-based Architectural Review for which he photographed major new American buildings. Thus his career in architectural photography was launched in New York with the 1958 commission to photograph the Seagram Building (Architects: Ludwig Mies van der Rohe, Philip Johnson).

Ever since then, Robinson has worked as a freelance photographer for architects and architectural magazines as well as Adjunct Professor of Architectural Photography in summer programs at Columbia University. More significantly, between the years 1987–2009, Robinson was an editor of photoessays for the journal, Places, and contributed many of his own works.  He has also exhibited in galleries and major art museums.

Approach to photography 
Robert Campbell of the Boston Globe discussing the 2008 By Way of Broadway exhibit at MIT, wrote: 'Robinson loves to find and record places where something new is collaged over something old ... A huge red Checks Cashed Open 24 Hours billboard splashes across what once, clearly, was an elegant movie theater in the Art Deco style. An auto body shop, with a phony castle-like façade, shoves itself rudely in front of a decayed object that appears once to have been a grand memorial arch. As we perceive such scenes, we visually peel back the present to reveal the past. Robinson is, among other things, a photographer of time itself.'

Grants and awards 
Among several honors and acknowledgments, Cervin Robinson received a Guggenheim Fellowship, 1971 and two fellowship residencies at the MacDowell Colony, Peterborough, NH 1996 and 1998.

Exhibitions 
 Photographing Places: The Photographers of Places Journal, 1987–2009, MIT Museum, Kurtz Gallery for Photography, Cambridge, MA, January 22 – August 16, 2015
 Cervin Robinson, The Century Association, New York, NY, February 25 – March 22, 2013
 By Way of Broadway, Massachusetts Institute of Technology, Cambridge, MA, 2008, and subsequently shown by the Municipal Society Gallery, New York, NY, 2009.
 Cervin Robinson, Cleveland, Ohio, The Cleveland Museum of Art, Cleveland, OH, 1989
 Cervin Robinson, Photographs, 1958–1983, The Farish Gallery, School of Architecture, Rice University, Houston, TX,  March–April 1983 and The Wellesley College Museum, Jewett Arts Center, Wellesley, MA, November 1983 – Jan 1984.
 Landmarks that Aren't, Municipal Art Society Gallery, New York, NY, 1982
 Skyscraper Style: Art Deco New York, Brooklyn Museum, Brooklyn, NY, 1975
 The Architecture of Frank Furness, Philadelphia Museum of Art, Philadelphia, PA,1973

Works and publications 
Chronological order by date of publication

References

External links 

 Cervin Robinson at Prints & Photographs Online Catalog (PPOC) at Library of Congress

1928 births
2022 deaths
American photographers
Harvard University alumni
Columbia University faculty
People from Boston